Ken and Neal Skupski were the defending champions but chose not to defend their title.

Julian Knowle and Adil Shamasdin won the title after defeating Dino Marcan and Tristan-Samuel Weissborn 6–3, 6–3 in the final.

Seeds

Draw

References
 Main Draw

Trofeo Faip-Perrel - Doubles
Trofeo Faip–Perrel